Webster is a census-designated place located in Rostraver Township, Westmoreland County in the state of Pennsylvania, United States.  The community is located along Pennsylvania Route 906.  It was laid out in 1833 by Benjamin Beazell, and named for the Federalist statesman Daniel Webster.  As of the 2010 census the population was 255 residents.

References

Census-designated places in Westmoreland County, Pennsylvania
Pennsylvania populated places on the Monongahela River
Census-designated places in Pennsylvania